Jenny Hval (born 11 July 1980) is a Norwegian singer-songwriter, record producer, and novelist. She has released eight solo albums, two under the alias Rockettothesky and six under her own name.

In 2015, Hval released her fifth studio album, Apocalypse, Girl, to widespread critical acclaim. The following year, she released Blood Bitch, a concept album influenced by vampires, menstruation and 1970s horror films.

Music career 
Until 1999, Hval was the vocalist of a gothic metal band called Shellyz Raven. She studied at the University of Melbourne, Australia, specializing in creative writing and performance. While studying, she was vocalist in Australian bands iPanic and Folding For Air with Thomas McGowan releasing an EP "Are you afraid of heights?" in 2004.

Moving back to Norway, she released her debut EP Cigars in 2006, and was nominated for a Spellemannprisen (the Norwegian equivalent of Grammy awards) in the "best newcomer" category. Adopting the name Rockettothesky, she was signed to Trust Me Records, releasing two studio albums – To Sing You Apple Trees in 2006, and Medea in 2008.

Following the release of Medea, she went back to using her birth name. Signing on the label Rune Grammofon, she released the albums Viscera (2011) and Innocence Is Kinky (2013). In 2015 she released her third album, Apocalypse, Girl on New York City's Sacred Bones Records. Her solo music has been described as avant-garde, art-pop, and "a kind of experimental folk music," among other terms. She has also collaborated with Håvard Volden, as Nude on Sand, releasing a self-titled album in 2012, and with Susanna Wallumrød, which resulted in a 2014 album Meshes of Voice (released on Wallumrød's SusannaSonata label). She supported St. Vincent on a tour.

In 2016 she released the album Blood Bitch where she collaborates with Lasse Marhaug. The album was awarded the Phonofile Nordic Music Prize in 2017. The judges released a statement calling the album "engrossing, atmospheric, challenging and thought-provoking."

In 2018 she collaborated with Håvard Volden again under the name Lost Girls, to release an EP entitled Feeling. The duo's name was inspired by the eponymous graphic novel.

In September 2019, Hval released her seventh album, The Practice of Love, featuring guest vocals from Vivian Wang, formerly of the psych rock band The Observatory, Australian singer-songwriter Laura Jean, and French experimental musician Félicia Atkinson. Hval had intended a tour to promote the album, but cancelled the North American shows due to the COVID-19 pandemic.

In 2021, Lost Girls released their first full-length LP, Menneskekollektivet. The album was received to "universal acclaim," according to aggregate review website Metacritic.

Classic Objects, her eighth album released in March 2022, also received universal critical acclaim.

Style and influences 
Hval was influenced by the androgyny in 1980s pop music. In particular, she was inspired by the music video for Kate Bush's song "Cloudbusting", which features Bush as a young boy; Hval has expressed her admiration for the English musician's ability to write from many different perspectives. In her Master's thesis, The Singing Voice as Literature, Hval explored the sound poetry of Kate Bush's music, analysing the lyrics and music together, instead of as separate parts of a song.

Hval's spoken-word delivery has been compared to Laurie Anderson's music.

Novels 
After studying literature and working as a freelance columnist and writer, Jenny Hval published her novel Perlebryggeriet (Pearl Brewery) in 2009. An English edition, titled Paradise Rot: A Novel, was translated by Marjam Idriss and published by Verso Books in October 2018. Her second work, Inn i ansiktet (Into the Face), was published in Norway in October 2012. Hval published her third novel, Å hate Gud (To Hate God), in 2018, which also received a translation into English by Marjam Idriss and was published by Verso Books under the title Girls Against God in October 2020.

Discography

Studio albums
As Rockettothesky

As Jenny Hval

With Lost Girls

With Nude on Sand

EPs
As Rockettothesky

With Lost Girls

As Jenny Hval

References

External links
 Official website

Last.fm Rockettothesky

Norwegian songwriters
Rune Grammofon artists
Norwegian writers
Norwegian Jews
1980 births
Living people
Musicians from Oslo
University of Melbourne alumni
People from Tvedestrand
21st-century Norwegian singers
21st-century Norwegian women singers
Sacred Bones Records artists